ROKS Jeju (FF-958) is the seventh ship of the Ulsan-class frigate in the Republic of Korea Navy. She is named after the island, Jeju.

Development 

In the early 1990s, the Korean government plan for the construction of next generation coastal ships named Frigate 2000 was scrapped due to the 1997 Asian financial crisis. But the decommissioning of the  destroyers and the aging fleet of Ulsan-class frigates, the plan was revived as the Future Frigate eXperimental, also known as FFX in the early 2000s. 

10 ships were launched and commissioned from 1980 to 1993. They have 3 different variants which consists of Flight I, Flight II and Flight III.

Construction and career 
ROKS Jeju was launched on 3 May 1988 by Daewoo Shipbuilding and commissioned on 1 January 1990.

She participated in Foal Eagle 2015.

Decommissioned	30 December 2022

References

External links

1988 ships
Ulsan-class frigates
Frigates of the Republic of Korea Navy
Ships built by Daewoo Shipbuilding & Marine Engineering